Flattr is a Swedish-based microdonation subscription service, where subscribers opt-in to pay a monthly patronage to help fund their favourite websites and creators.

Flattr subscribers install an open-source browser extension that records which websites they frequent and shares this data with Flattr. Flattr processes this user data and pays out shares of the user's subscription to each registered Flattr creator based on which websites the user consumed. Flattr filters websites by domains with a default whitelist of participating domains, but individual users can override and contribute to any website they want or withhold contributions from any website.

History 

In March 2010, Flattr launched on an invitation-only basis and then opened to the public on 12 August of the same year.

Flattr is a project started by Peter Sunde and Linus Olsson. The first version of Flattr required users to click on a flattr button on websites to flattr content. Sunde said, "We want to encourage people to share money as well as content." The current version lets users pay a monthly donation (provided a minimum of 3 dollars) which is automatically split among websites, pages or platforms that are "" by Flattr's web extension.

In December 2010, Flattr received large-scale attention when it was tweeted to be a method of donating money to WikiLeaks, which had recently been cut off by PayPal, Visa, and MasterCard.

On 28 April 2011, Flattr announced by email that they would not require users to subscribe to donate to others before they could be donated to themselves, starting from 1 May 2011.

On 16 April 2013, Twitter announced that they would no longer allow Flattr users to donate to favorite sites via the Twitter platform, citing commercial confusion problems they believed would occur between users.

In May 2016, Flattr partnered with the developer of the ad blocking browser extension Adblock Plus to create Flattr Plus, a service which allows users to automatically distribute a designated budget of monthly payments to web publishers based on their engagement. The service was conceived as a way for users to support online publishers as an alternative to advertising.

On 5 April 2017, Adblock Plus publisher Eyeo GmbH announced that it had acquired Flattr for an undisclosed amount. Flattr also announced a beta of an overhauled "zero-click" version of the service adapted from the Flattr Plus concept.

On 24 October 2017, Flattr announced the launch of “Flattr 2.0”. This version of Flattr continues as a zero-click service for automatic denoting of content on the web and various platforms as donation-worthy. Content creators now only have to link their websites or supported platforms to be able to receive payments.

On 24 May 2018, Flattr made changes to their privacy policy to comply with the GDPR and began deleting previously collected user activity after three months. Flattr's old privacy policy allowed them to keep a record of their subscribers’ web browsing history indefinitely.

Supported creator platforms 
Flattr 2.0 can be used on websites via a metatag, and supports various creator platforms. YouTube, Wordpress, Vimeo, Twitter, Twitch, Soundcloud, GitHub, 500px and Flickr are all currently supported.

Corporate affairs

Funding 
In 2012, Flattr received €1.6 million in funding from Passion Capital Investments, LLP and Federico Pirzio-Biroli.

As part of its collaboration with Flattr, Eyeo GmbH also made an investment in Flattr.

Sponsorships 
In 2017, Flattr became a supporting partner of MozFest, Mozilla's annual festival devoted to a healthy web.

Awards 
 Best New Startup in 2010 - TechCrunch Europe.
 Hoola Bandoola Band award.
 Top-10 in Netexplorateur 2011.

See also 
 
 Google Contributor

References

External links 
 

Digital currencies
Payment service providers
Micropayment
Swedish companies established in 2010